Parliamentary elections were held in North Korea on 25 August 1948 to elect the members of the 1st Supreme People's Assembly. Organised by the People's Committee of North Korea, the elections saw 572 deputies elected, of which 212 were from North Korea and 360 from South Korea.

Background

United Nations-sponsored elections for the Constitutional Assembly in US-occupied South Korea were held on 10 May 1948 under supervision of UNTCOK.

Elections in the Soviet-occupied North were announced at the fifth session of the People's Assembly of North Korea on 9 July 1948 as part of the preparations for the establishment of the Democratic People's Republic of Korea. At the second conference of leaders of political parties and social organizations from North and South Korea held from 29 June to 5 July, it was decided that the elections should also be held in South Korea. A decision of the Election Guidance Committee determined that the 360 South Korean deputies would be elected indirectly, with South Korean voters electing people's delegates who would subsequently elect the South Korean deputies.

In North Korea, registration of candidates took place until 5 August 1948, with 228 candidates registered in 212 electoral districts. Among the 228 candidates were 212 candidates nominated by the Democratic Front for the Reunification of Korea and 16 other candidates recommended by voters at meetings. The candidates from the Democratic Front for the Reunification of Korea consisted of 102 candidates from the Workers' Party of North Korea (one of precursor of the WPK), 35 candidates from the Democratic Party,  35 candidates from the Chondoist Chongu Party and 40 independent candidates. There were 34 women among the 228 candidates.

Results

North Korea

South Korea 
The North Korean government claimed that 78% of eligible voters in South Korea took part in the election of 1,080 people's delegates. The South Korean people's delegates subsequently met on 21–26 August in Northern Haeju, with 1,002 of the 1,080 elected representatives participating. They elected 360 deputies to the Supreme People's Assembly on the basis of one deputy per 50,000 South Koreans.

Election of representatives

Election of South Korean deputies

Elected members
The following were elected as members of parliament:

 Kim Il-sung
 Kim Tu-bong
 Ho Hon
 Kim Tal-hyon
 Yi Yong
 Hong Nam-pyo
 Hong Ki-ju
 Pak Hon-yong
 Hong Myong-hui
 Kim Chaek
 Kang Yang-uk
 Kang Sun
 Kang Chin-gon
 Ku Chae-su
 Kim Pyong-je
 Kim Chang-jun
 Na Sung-gyu
 Yu Yong-jun
 Yi Ku-hun
 Yi Ki-yong
 Yi Nung-jong
 Pak Yun-gil
 Pak Chong-ae
 Song Chu-sik
 Chang Kwon
 Chang Sun-myong
 Cho Un
 Choe Kyong-dok
 Chong Chun-taek
 Choe Yong-gon
 Kim Won-bong
 Pak Il-u
 Pak Mun-gyu
 Chang Si-u
 Chu Yong-ha
 Choe Chang-ik
 Paek Nam-un
 Kim Chong-ju
 Yi Suing-yop
 Ho Chong-suk
 Ho Song-taek
 Yi Pyong-nam
 Yi Yong
 Yi Kuk-no
 Chang Hae-u
 No Chin-han
 Kim Il
 Pak Hun-il
 Ho Ka-i
 Pak Chang-sik
 Kim O-song
 Ko Hui-man
 Pang Hak-se
 Kang Kon
 Kang Ung-jin
 Yi Man-gyu
 Kim Sam-yong
 Pak Se-yong
 Kim Song-gyu
 Yun Haeng-jung
 Kang Mun-sok
 Song Ul-su
 Kim Sang-hyok
 Yi Tong-hwa
 Han Hyo-sam
 Chong Il-yong
 Yun Hyong-sik
 Yi Ki-sok
 Song Pong-uk
 Kim Ung-gi
 Kim Chae-uk
 Hong Ki-hwang
 Yi Sok-bo
 Kim Yong-su
 Nam Il
 Yi Pyong-je
 Yi Yo-song
 Tak Chang-hyok
 Cho Yong-se
 Yi Sang-jun
 Kim Ki-do
 Kim Kwang-su
 Choe Ik-han
 Yu Hae-bung
 Choe Chun-yong
 Kim Yol
 Yi Hong-yol
 Kim Chan
 Yun Chung-u
 Choe Won-tack
 Chong Song-on
 YiSik
 Kim Hwang-il
 Kim Ki-ju
 Yi Chong-man
 Pak Yong-song
 Yi Yu-min
 Pak Chang-ok
 Yi Yong-jun
 Yi In-dong
 Cho Chung-gwang
 Yu Ki-sop
 Yi Chom-sun
 Chong No-sik
 Han Sang-muk
 Kim Yong-jae
 Kim Yong-dam
 O Chae-yong
 Kim Ok-bin
 Choe Pong-su
 Hwang Tae-song
 Han Il-su
 Kim Yong-wan
 Tae Song-su
 Yi Chu-yon
 Kim Sang-chol
 Pak Sang-jun
 Kim Min-san
 Kim Yun-gol
 Chon Chan-bae
 Cho Hi-yong
 U Pong-un
 Yi Tae-song
 Hwang Uk
 YiChu-ha
 Chong Paek
 No Sok-kwi
 So Kap-sun
 Cho Pom-gu
 Han Sol-ya
 Chu Hwang-sop
 Han Il-mu
 Pak Chi-ho
 Kim Chung-gyu
 Yi Mun-hwan
 Ok Yong-ja
 Hong Myon-hu
 Kim Son-gil
 Ham Ik-nok
 Kim Won-hyong
 Pak Il-yong
 Kim Song-ok
 Kim Nam-chon
 Won Ho-sun
 Song Myong-hon
 Choe Son-gyu
 Pak Chun-yong
 Song Kyu-hwan
 Yi Won-il
 Chong Tae-sok
 Chae Chun-sok
 Yi Yong-som
 Kim Su-hyon
 Won Man-su
 Chong Chol
 Kim Il-chong
 Kim Sung-hyon
 Kim Hyong-gon
 Kim Myong-sok
 Kim Song-hak
 Chong Un-yong
 Pak Yong-han
 Yi Kang-guk
 O Ki-sop
 Kim Hae-chon
 Yi Sang-sun
 Kim Sang-ju
 Chu Hae
 Yun Su
 Yi Hyok-yong
 Pak Ki-ho
 Sin Nam-chol
 Chong Chu-gyong
 Yi Sul-chin
 Sin Yong-bok
 Choe Yong-dal
 Kim Sung-mo
 Chong Chong-sik
 Cho Chae-han
 Kim Chae-rok
 Yi Tong-yong
 Won Hong-gu
 Kim Paek-tong
 Ho Nam-hu
 Paek Pong-son
 Choe Ung-yo
 Yi Son-jae
 Yom Chong-gwon
 Yu Tong-yol
 Chang U-uk
 Choe Song-hwan
 Yang Hong-ju
 Yi Chil-song
 Son Tong-gi
 Paek Pyong-ik
 Yi Chae-yong
 Choe Son-ja
 Kang Chun-sam
 Min Hyok-cho
 Chong Chil-song
 Kye Tong-son
 Kim Ho-sun
 Choe Yun-ok
 Choe Sung-hui
 Pak Won-jun
 Yi Chong-song
 Kim Kil-su
 Chon Pok-chin
 Kim Yong-yun
 Yi Chong-yol
 Yu Hyong-gyu
 Yi Sang-in
 Ham Se-dok
 Yim Chae-yong
 Sin Chin-u
 Yi Tong-gun
 Yi Hong-yon
 Ham To-gyom
 Kim Tok-hung
 So Pyong-su
 Cho Yong-nae
 Kim Hae-jin
 Kim Han-il
 Yi Chang-gyu
 Pak Sang-sun
 Kim Tong-il
 Kim Mu-sam
 Yi Man-su
 Won Chon-jun
 Ho Sin
 Yi Tu-san
 Yu Yong-yun
 Mun Ok-sun
 Hong Kwang-jun
 Maeng Tu-un
 Yang Po-hyon
 O Ki-ok
 O Yong
 Yi Chol
 Yun Sang-man
 Yi Chang-ha
 Chon Suk-cha
 Kim Wan-gun
 Kang Yun-won
 Kwak Chu-sok
 Yi Chun-su
 Chong Yon-tae
 Chae Paek-hui
 Kim Sun-il
 Kim Se-yul
 Song Wan-sok
 Kim Kye-rim
 Kim Hyon-guk
 Ko Chun-taek
 Yi Pong-nyon
 Chong Se-yol
 Cho Pok-nye
 Yi Chae-hyang
 Kil Won-pal
 Yi Sun-jo
 Mun Tong-yong
 Yi Uk
 Chong Se-ho
 Kim Ho-yong
 Kim Han-ung
 Kim Hak-chong
 Kwon Pyong-chol
 Svl Pysng-ho
 Hong Sung-guk
 Ko Sok-hwan
 Kim Su-il
 Pak Chong-hyon
 Yi Sang-hun
 An Yong-il
 Chang Kil-yong
 Kim Yu-yong
 Hwang Tae-yol
 An Sin-ho
 Paek Nak-yong
 Chon Yong-pi
 YiSuk-kyong
 An Yong gil
 Kim Yong-guk
 Kim Sun-nam
 Hong Son-u
 Chang Chun
 Yi Kyu-hui
 Kim Myong-hwan
 Hyon Hun
 Choe Sok-sun
 Kim Chol-ho
 Kim Tae-hong
 Pak Si-yun
 An Si-do
 Yi Yong-dok
 Kim Si-yop
 Kim Hyong-tae
 Yi Chae-yong
 Pak Chong-tae
 Mun Sang-jik
 Kim Tae-ja
 Yi Tong-tak
 Yi In-gyu
 O Sin-nam
 Yi Sok-sung
 Choe Kim-bok
 Yi Hwan-gi
 Cho Chung-gon
 Yi Chin-gun
 Yi Chi-chan
 Han Chun-yo
 Pak Chan-hyok
 Kim Chom-gwon
 Yu Chin-yong
 Yi Hae-su
 Yi Chong-suk
 Yim Sang-sun
 Yi Chin
 Song On-pil
 Kim Tak
 Choe Kwan-yong
 Yi Pong-nam
 Yi Pyong-ho
 Pak Chi-hwa
 Kim Yu-tae
 Yun Sang-yol
 Kim Pyong-je
 Kim Ui-su
 Pak Chal
 So Chang-sop
 Pak Pok-cho
 Chong Sin-hyon
 Choe Son-bi
 Mun Ui-sok
 Yi Hun
 Yun Pyong-gwan
 Kim Nanju-hwa
 Chon Yong-uk
 Cho Tae-u
 Pak Sung-gik
 Hong Myon-ok
 Yi Chong-myong
 Kim Yong-sop
 An Yong-muk
 Chang Chol
 Mun Hong-gi
 Chong Kil-song
 Kim Ki-su
 Chu Chang-son
 Choe Ki-nam
 Cho Kum-song
 Kim Chol-su
 Yi Pyong-hu
 Yi Tu-won
 Chong Nam-jo
 Pak Chang-gu
 O Chol-chu
 Kim Pong-son
 Song Chae-chol
 Kwon Yong-ju
 Kim Pil-chu
 Cha Chi-hun
 Pak Pong-u
 Chong In-sok
 Hyon Sung-gap
 Yi Hi-bong
 Kang In-gol
 Pak Pyong-jik
 Pak Mun-sun
 Ha Yong-suk
 Yun Chae-bong
 Hong Chung-sik
 Yi Kun-u
 Ko Chol-u
 Kil Chin-sop
 Yi Chang-su
 Choe Ka-ma
 Kim Han-jung
 Yi Po-yol
 O Chae-il
 Ok Mun-hwan
 Hwang Un-bong
 Kim On
 Chang Sang-bong
 Kim Tae-song
 Min Ki-won
 Cho Song-gyu
 Kim Chang-nok
 Choe Kwang
 Kim Nak-to
 Hong Ki-mun
 Yi Song-jong
 Chon Chung-hak
 Yi Chin-suk
 Paek Ung-yop
 Yun In-yong
 Kim Ui-sun
 Yi Min-yong
 Chu Chin-hwang
 No Myong-hwan
 Chang Ki-uk
 Yi Sang-ho
 Na Yun-chul
 Song Chong-gun
 Pak Song-ok
 Pak Kun-mo
 Song Tae-jun
 Chon Pyong-gi
 Kim Pyong-mun
 Ma Chong-hwa
 Yi Kang-mu
 Ho Ha-baek
 Kim Si-gyom
 Sin Hyon-u
 Yi Song-baek
 Kim Myong-ni
 Yi Yong-jin
 Chon Chong-il
 Mun Tu-jae
 Kim Yong-hui
 Kim Tae-ryon
 Yim Chong-sun
 O Ho-sok
 Yi Yong-son
 Yi Tong-son
 Pak Chin-hong
 Yi Chong-gu
 Chon Kap-sun
 Ko Chang-nam
 Kim Son-cho
 Choe Han-chol
 Kang Kyu-chan
 Han Yang-ul
 Yi Chong-gwon
 Han Yong-gyu
 Kwon Un-hae
 Kang Chol
 Yi Kwan-sul
 Yu Myong-sok
 Han Chong-su
 Kwon O-jik
 Song Tae-rae
 An Ki-song
 Kim Che-won
 Hwang Il-bo
 Om Aeng-gwan
 Yim Tong-uk
 Kim Mun-hwan
 Kim Kwang-jun
 Cho Yong
 Yu Sok-kyun
 Kang Sin-u
 Mun Min-un
 Pyon Ki-chang
 Choe In
 Yi Pok-ki
 Ho Chun
 Ko Chin-hui
 Kim Tal-sam
 Song Song-chol
 Yi Myon-hong
 Kim Pyong-ju
 Kim Man-jung
 Chon Pong-hwa
 Ko Kyong-in
 An Hai-nam
 Chong Chin-sop
 Kim Ki-taek
 Sin Paek-hyon
 Yi Sang-gap
 Pak Un-song
 Choe San-hwa
 Kim Tae-bong
 Choe Suk-yang
 Yu Kim-bong
 Kim To-song
 Kim Chong-sun
 Kim Ung-yul
 Son Tu-hwan
 Son Chong-yol
 Kim Yong-ho
 Kim Yong-uk
 Cho Won-suk
 Kim Chang-han
 Yang Won-mo
 An Se-hun
 Han Chang-gyo
 Han Chang-su
 Chu Man-sul
 Yim Taek
 Han Chang-ho
 Ho Man-ho
 Han Kyong-su
 Paek Pa
 Yo Un-chol
 Pak Hyong-uk
 Cho U-bang
 Chong Chae-son
 Yi Pyong-il
 Yim Pung-won
 Kang In-gyu
 Pak Chun-on
 Yi Pyong-no
 Yi Chong-wan
 Pak Po-ok
 Kim Po-pae
 Yi Ho-je
 Pak Pil-hwan
 Sin Sun-ye
 Yi Ki-hwan
 Song Chun-ho
 O Che-hong
 Yu Yong-sang
 Kim Un-han
 Kim In-bae
 Pak Kon-byong
 O Ok-byol
 Yi So-un
 Yi So-hyang
 Kang Song-jae
 Yi Chang-bin
 Song Chae-hyon
 Cho Pok-ae
 Hyon Po-yol
 Chong In-chul
 Sin Sun-jik
 Kim Chae-yong
 O Tae-yong
 Choe Wol-song
 Kim Ki-nam
 Kim Il-son
 Mun Chi-hwa
 Kim Tuk-nan
 Choe Han-sik
 Hong Chol-hi
 Kim Yon-pil
 Kim Hyo-won
 Kim Yong-won
 Kim Chong-ae
 Pae Hyong-han
 Song Kum-ae
 Ko Kwang-han
 Yi Suk-yo
 Kang Yong-sun
 Yi Yong-ju
 Ha Pil-won
 Hong Chin
 Kim Hong-gi
 Kim Chin-ho
 Yi Kyong-dong
 Kim Sang-sun
 Chang Ha-myong
 Chon Yun-do
 Kim Man-su
 Chae Ki-ok
 Yi Sok-ha
 Kim Song-yul
 Sok Tae-ryong
 Sin Sang-dong
 Kim Chae-ul
 Yun Yong-jun
 Chong Chu-ha
 Chon Song-ok
 Yom Ui-hyon
 Cho Tong-sok
 Kim Op-tol
 Yun Hui-gu
 Kim Nak-chin
 Pak Chae-sop
 Kim Yong-un
 Kwon Tae-bong
 Sin Sang-hun

References

Further reading

Elections in North Korea
North Korea
Parliamentary
Supreme People's Assembly
Election and referendum articles with incomplete results